The Fireman is the second film Charlie Chaplin distributed by the Mutual Film Corporation in 1916. Released on June 12, it starred Chaplin as the fireman and Edna Purviance as the daughter to Lloyd Bacon.

Plot

A group of firemen, led by their foreman (Eric Campbell), practice in the fire station, but one is missing ... Charlie. He is still sleeping. The bell eventually wakes him and he slides down the pole to join the others. He reverses the pair of horses onto the fire engine and drives off, but without the others. He reverses the horses back again. Their first task is to polish the engine, but a lot of butt-kicking ensues.

During their meal break Charlie uses the engine as a giant water urn and serves an unappetising soup to the others.

A young woman comes to the station with her aristocratic father, and the foreman sends Charlie away so he can talk with the father. Charlie and the girl flirt on one side of the station while the girl's father (Bacon) arranges with the local fire chief to have his house burn down so he can collect the insurance money. In exchange for the chief's complicity in the arson, the father will permit the fire chief to marry his daughter.

However, a real fire breaks out elsewhere in the town. The owner uses a public alarm to signal to the station but Charlie and another fireman continue to play draughts and ignore the alarm, putting a cloth in the bell to stop it ringing. The worried man then phones the fire station but they still ignore him. Finally he goes to the fire station in person. Eventually Charlie understands the predicament, and finds the fire chief at the girl's house and the company rush to extinguish the fire. Charlie mans the hose but his aim is poor and the chief has to take over.

Meanwhile, the father deliberately sets a fire in the basement of his own house without realizing that his daughter is still inside the house on the upper floor. Upon knowing his daughter is in mortal danger from the fire, he rushes to find the fire chief to cancel the arrangement not to extinguish his house fire. The fireman (Chaplin), who is also in love with the daughter, abandons the first house fire (taking the fire engine and water) to rush to the second one. The water tank falls off during the rush. He heroically scales the outside of the building to save her, carrying her back down the face of the building, but then fainting. When he revives he and the girl go off arm in arm.

Reviews
A critic for the New York Dramatic Mirror wrote, "The Fireman is the second of the Chaplin Mutual comedies, presenting that well-known hero in a whirl of fun and laughter that compares favorably with the best work he has yet done on the screen."

A reviewer from the Chicago Tribune was more critical in his appraisal of The Fireman. He wrote, "There is more of soup-spilling and Keystone kicking than is necessary for successful slapsticking, but there is also a certain novelty of situation and a jolly humor in its expression that moves to much mirth. Charles Chaplin is a true comedian who doesn't need to resort to the conflict of the physical to make fun. He has a sufficiently mobile expression to do that."

Production background

The film shows some early morning street scenes in the surrounding Los Angeles area.

The film makes use of reversing the film several times for comic effect: sliding up the fireman's pole, reversing the horses, hurrying back to station (in reverse) when he forgets the crew etc. The huge water tank in the station also comically has a second function as the coffee machine. A lot of the kicking in the film is clearly unfaked and fairly violent.

Cast
 Charles Chaplin as Fireman
 Edna Purviance as Girl
 Lloyd Bacon as Her Father
 Eric Campbell as Foreman of the Brigade
 Leo White as Owner of Burning House
 Albert Austin as Fireman
 John Rand as Fireman
 James T. Kelley as Fireman 
 Frank J. Coleman as Fireman

Sound version
In 1932, Amedee Van Beuren of Van Beuren Studios, purchased Chaplin's Mutual comedies for $10,000 each, added music by Gene Rodemich and Winston Sharples and sound effects, and re-released them through RKO Radio Pictures. Chaplin had no legal recourse to stop the RKO release.

See also
List of firefighting films

References

External links

1916 films
American black-and-white films
1916 comedy films
Silent American comedy films
Short films directed by Charlie Chaplin
Films about firefighting
American silent short films
1916 short films
Articles containing video clips
American comedy short films
Mutual Film films
1910s American films